The Adams State Grizzlies are the athletic teams that represent Adams State University, located in Alamosa, Colorado, in NCAA Division II intercollegiate sports. The Grizzlies compete as members of the Rocky Mountain Athletic Conference for all 19 varsity sports.

Varsity sports

Teams

Men's sports
 Baseball
 Basketball
 Cross Country
 Football
 Lacrosse
 Soccer
 Track & Field
 Wrestling

Women's sports
 Basketball
 Cross Country
 Golf
 Lacrosse
 Soccer
 Softball
 Swimming & Diving
 Track & Field
 Volleyball

National championships

Team
The Grizzlies have won fifty-four team national championships.

Individual sports

Cross-country and track
The Grizzly track and cross-country teams are coached by Damon Martin, winner of 20 National Coach of the Year awards. Martin was inducted into Adams State's Hall of Fame in 2007, and the Colorado Running Hall of Fame in 2015. In 2018, he was inducted into the USTFCCCA Hall of Fame. ASU's Men's cross-country team was the first team in history to record a perfect score at the National Championships in 1992. This was the first year Adams competed in NCAA Division II, after previously competing in the NAIA. The women's cross-country team won 15 National Championships between 1992 and 2009. 2016 World Indoor Champion Boris Berian ran for Adams during the 2012 track seasons, winning national championships for the 800m both indoors and outdoors.

Football

Jarrell Harrison is the head coach of the Adams State Grizzlies football team.

Conferences
 1930–1945: Independent
 1946–1955: New Mexico Intercollegiate Conference
 1956: Independent
 1957–present: Rocky Mountain Athletic Conference

Non-NCAA sports

Teams

Men's sports
 Rugby
 Rodeo

Women's sports
 Rodeo

Co-ed sports
 Cycling
 Climbing

References

External links